This is the list of episodes from the anime adaption of DearS. The series was broadcast on Chiba TV, TV Kanagawa, TV Saitama, Tokyo MX TV, TV Santerebi, TV Aichi and TVQ Kyushu from July 10 to September 25, 2004. From August 2, 2005 to February 21, 2006 the series has been published into four DVDs.

Episode list

References

External links 

Dears